XETPH-AM is a radio station located in Santa María de Ocotán, Durango. Broadcasting on 960 AM, XETPH is operated by the Sistema de Radiodifusoras Culturales Indígenas (SRCI) of the National Institute of Indigenous Peoples (INPI) and is known as Las Tres Voces de Durango (The Three Voices of Durango). It is the 21st station in the SRCI system of indigenous radio stations, coming to air on November 8, 2012 with programming in O´dam-audam, Nahuatl and Wixarika. It was the first new SRCI AM radio station since XENKA-AM signed on in 1995.

External links
XETPH website

References

Sistema de Radiodifusoras Culturales Indígenas
Radio stations in Durango
Radio stations established in 2012
2012 establishments in Mexico